S

Dichagyris candelisequa is a moth of the family Noctuidae. It is found from central Europe and southern Siberia to northern Iran, Afghanistan, Turkey and northern Africa.

The wingspan is 40–50 mm. Adults are on wing from May to July. There is one generation per year.

The larvae feed on Poaceae species and other herbaceous plants.

Subspecies
Dichagyris candelisequa candelisequa
Dichagyris  candelisequa achaemenidica (Israel)
Dichagyris candelisequa defasciata

External links

 Noctuinae of Israel
 Lepiforum.de

candelisequa
Moths of Europe
Moths of the Middle East
Moths described in 1775